Final Surrender are an Indian Christian metal band, who play metalcore, folk metal and progressive metal music. They started making music together in 2007. They have released two studio albums, Empty Graves (2013), and Nothing But Void (2017) with Rottweiler Records.

Background
The band originated in Bangalore, Karnataka, India, where they formed in 2007. Their current members are vocalist, Joseph Samuel, guitarists, Sanjay Kumar and James Stephanes, bassist, Judah Sandhy, and drummer, Jared Sandhy.

Music history
The band are signed to Rottweiler Records. On 5 November 2013, they released the studio albumEmpty Graves.

Members
 Joseph Samuel – vocals 
 Sanjay Kumar – guitar 
 James Stephanes – guitar
 Eric Gerald – bass
 Jared Sandhy – drums

Discography

Studio albums
 Empty Graves (5 November 2013, Rottweiler)
 Nothing But Void (26 October 2016 [India]/13 January 2017 [Worldwide], Rottweiler)

Compilation appearances
 The Pack Vol. 1 (2016; Rottweiler)
 Metal From The Dragon (Vol. 2) (2017; The Bearded Dragon Productions)

References

External links

Indian musical groups
Musical groups established in 2007
Rottweiler Records artists